Regen (Northern Bavarian: Reng) is a town in Bavaria, Germany, and the district town of the district of Regen.

Geography
Regen is situated on the great Regen River, located in the Bavarian Forest.

Divisions
Originally the town consisted of 4 districts: Bürgerholz, Grubhügel, Riedham and St. Johann.

After a governmental reform the villages of:

  Aden
  Augrub
  Bärndorf
  Bettmannsäge
  Dreieck
  Ebenhof
  Ecklend
  Edhof
  Eggenried
  Finkenried
  Frauenmühle
  Großseiboldsried
  Huberhof
  Kagerhof
  Kattersdorf
  Kerschlhöh
  Kleinseiboldsried
  Kreuzerhof
  Kühhof
  March
  Maschenberg
  Matzelsried
  Metten
  Neigerhöhe
  Neigermühle
  Neusohl
  Obermitterdorf
  Oberneumais
  Oleumhütte
  Pfistermühle
  Pometsau
  Poschetsried
  Reinhartsmais
  Richtplatz
  Rinchnachmündt
  Rohrbach
  Sallitz
  Schauerhof
  Schlossau
  Schochert
  Schollenried
  Schönhöh
  Schützenhof
  Schwaighof
  Schweinhütt
  Spitalhof
  Sumpering
  Tausendbach
  Thanhof
  Thurnhof
  Weißenstein
  Weißensteiner-Au
  Wickersdorf
  Wieshof and Windschnur 

were added.

Population development

1828: 1196 
1904: 2366 
1974: 9029 
2005: 12.553 
2015: 10.855

International relations

Regen is twinned with:
  Eschwege, Germany, since 1997
  Mirebeau, France
  Roth bei Nürnberg, Germany

Notable places
The "Niederbayrisches Landwirtschaftsmuseum" is a museum showing the history of agriculture and society in Lower Bavaria from the 18th and 19th century.

The "Fressendes Haus" is a former domicile of the poets Clara Nordström (1886–1962) and Siegfried von Vegesack (1888–1974), which was transformed in a museum in 1984 presenting different expositions of historical art and the archeological excavations at the castle ruin of Weißenstein.

Natural monuments 
 The Pfahl is a 150-kilometre-long quartz ridge. In the vicinity of  Weißenstein it reaches its highest point at 750 metres at the site of Weißenstein Castle.

Economy
Tourism figures largely in the local economy, with over 64,000 visitors accounting for 220,000 over-night stays last year.

Personalities 
 Clara Nordström, Swedish writer (1886-1962)

References

External links

 
Pichelsteinerfest Regen 

Regen (district)
Bavarian Forest